Calamian Tagbanwa is spoken in the Calamian Islands just north of Palawan Island, Philippines. It is not mutually intelligible with the other languages of the Tagbanwa people. Ethnologue reports that it is spoken in Busuanga, Coron, Culion, and Linapacan municipalities (Calamian and Linapacan island groups).

Dialects
Himes (2006) considers there to be two distinct dialects.
Karamiananen: spoken on Busuanga Island and Dipalengged Island. The speakers on Dipalengged Island refer to their language as Tagbanwa.
Tagbanwa of Coron: spoken on Coron Island, and also in Baras, Palawan Island located just opposite of Dumaran Island.

Phonology

Consonants

Vowels

Grammar

Pronouns
The following set of pronouns are the pronouns found in the Calamian Tagbanwa language. Note: the direct/nominative case is divided between full and short forms.

References

Languages of Palawan
Calamian languages